Bartel John Jonkman (April 28, 1884 – June 13, 1955) was a politician from the U.S. state of Michigan.

Jonkman was born in Grand Rapids, Michigan, where he attended the public schools. He was of Dutch descent. He graduated from the law department of the  University of Michigan in 1914, was admitted to the bar the same year, and commenced practice in Grand Rapids. He served as assistant prosecutor of Kent County from 1915 to 1920, and as prosecuting attorney from 1929 to 1936.

Following the death of U.S. Representative Carl E. Mapes, in December 1939, a special election was held on February 19, 1940, to fill the vacancy. Jonkman was elected as a Republican from Michigan's 5th congressional district to the 76th United States Congress, serving from February 19, 1940, to January 3, 1949. In the 1948 Republican primary, he was defeated for re-nomination by Gerald Ford, then 34 years old, who eventually served as the 38th President of the United States from 1974–1977.

A confidential 1943 analysis of the House Foreign Affairs Committee by Isaiah Berlin for the British Foreign Office described Jonkman as

Bartel J. Jonkman had become unpopular largely due to his isolationist position on foreign policy. He resumed the practice of law and died in Grand Rapids. He was interred there in Woodlawn Cemetery.

References

The Political Graveyard

1884 births
1955 deaths
Politicians from Grand Rapids, Michigan
American people of Dutch descent
Republican Party members of the United States House of Representatives from Michigan
Old Right (United States)
20th-century American politicians
University of Michigan Law School alumni